The 1980 Sun Belt Conference men's basketball tournament was held February 23–25 at the Charlotte Coliseum in Charlotte, North Carolina.

VCU defeated UAB in the championship game, 105–88, to win their first Sun Belt men's basketball tournament. Both programs were in their first season in the Sun Belt.

The Rams, in turn, received an automatic bid for the 1980 NCAA tournament, where they lost to Iowa in the first round. Top-seeded South Alabama, who lost to VCU in the semifinal round, still received an at-large bid; the Jaguars ultimately lost to Alcorn State in the NCAA tournament's first round.

Format
With the addition of UAB and VCU to the Sun Belt, the conference's membership expanded to eight teams. All eight teams participated in the tournament field and were seeded based on their regular season conference records. All eight teams entered the single-elimination tournament in the quarterfinal round.

All of the games were played at the Charlotte Coliseum in Charlotte, North Carolina.

Bracket

References

Sun Belt Conference men's basketball tournament
Tournament
Sun Belt Conference men's basketball tournament
Sun Belt Conference men's basketball tournament